Nibley may refer to:

Places

in England
Nibley, Forest of Dean, a location in Gloucestershire that is part of Blakeney
Nibley, South Gloucestershire, Gloucestershire, near Yate
North Nibley, commonly known as Nibley, a village in the Stroud district of Gloucestershire, near Wotton-under-Edge
Battle of Nibley Green
Nibley Monument

in the United States
Nibley, Oregon
Nibley, Utah

People with the surname
Charles W. Nibley (1849–1931), bishop of the Church of Jesus Christ of Latter Day Saints
Hugh Nibley (1910–2005), Mormon academic and author
Reid N. Nibley (1923–2008), American pianist and composer
Richard Nibley (1913–1979), American musician
Sloan Nibley (1908–1990), American screenwriter
Christopher Sloan Nibley (1948-) Director of Photography, Photographer